Kharkiv State Academy of Physical Culture is a Ukrainian Academy of University level in Kharkiv.

History
The university opened in 1930 as the National Institute of Physical Education of Ukraine in Kharkiv. Between 1930-1944 was renamed to the National Institute of Physical Education of Ukraine; in 1979-1989 – Sport Faculty of Kyiv State Institute of Physical Culture; 1989-2001 – Kharkiv State University of Physical Culture. In 1944 the institute was transferred to Kiev and changed its name to Kyiv State Institute of Physical Education.

Institutes and faculties
The Academy consists of 4 colleges, 5 faculties, 18 departments, the Preparatory Centre for foreign students, the School of Outstanding Sportsmanship, a scientific and research centre, the Centre of Computer technologies and information support of the process of physical education and sports. The Academy also provides post graduate courses for its students.

Faculty of Sport Games and Martial Arts;
Faculty of Cyclic Sports;
Faculty of Physical Education and Health;
Faculty of extramural (distance learning), re-qualification and postgraduate education.

Sports and supporting facilities
 Faculties.
 Departments.
 Educational and scientific-methodical department.
 Department of International Cooperation.
 Department for promotion of the employment of students and graduates.
 Library.
 Technical Department.
 Reading Hall.
 Sports facilities.
 Athletic Club.
 Research laboratory.

Notable alumni

Vadim Garbuzov, world champion in professional show dance, Latin and Standard 2015
 Vadym Gutzeit (born 1971), saber fencer, Olympic and Maccabiah champion, Youth and Sport Minister of Ukraine
Igor Olshanetskyi (born 1986), Israeli Olympic weightlifter
Elbrus Tedeyev, Olympic champion wrestler

External links
 Official site
 External Reference

Universities in Ukraine
Sports universities and colleges
Universities and colleges in Kharkiv
Sport in Kharkiv
Educational institutions established in 1930
1930 establishments in Ukraine